Felicia Rogic ( Karlsson; born 23 September 1993) is a Swedish football forward currently playing for Eskilstuna United in the Damallsvenskan. She previously played for Eskilstuna United DFF.

References

External links
Piteå player profile  
Damallsvenskan player profile 

1993 births
Living people
Swedish women's footballers
Damallsvenskan players
Piteå IF (women) players
Eskilstuna United DFF players
Women's association football forwards
Kvarnsvedens IK players
People from Eskilstuna
Sportspeople from Södermanland County